Bathcotylidae is a family of trematodes belonging to the order Plagiorchiida.

Genera:
 Bathycotyle Darr, 1902

References

Plagiorchiida